Evenamide (developmental code names NW-3509, NW-3509A) is a selective voltage-gated sodium channel blocker, including (and not limited to) subtypes Nav1.3, Nav1.7, and Nav1.8, which is described as an antipsychotic and is under development by Newron Pharmaceuticals as an add-on therapy for the treatment of schizophrenia. The drug has shown efficacy in animal models of psychosis, mania, depression, and aggression. It has completed phase I clinical trials, and phase II clinical trials will be commenced in the third quarter of 2015.

See also 
 List of investigational antipsychotics

References

External links 
 NW-3509 - Newron Pharmaceuticals
 NW-3509 - AdisInsight

Antipsychotics
Carboxamides
Experimental drugs
Phenethylamines
Sodium channel blockers